Lezey is a commune in the Moselle department in Grand Est in north-eastern France.

See also
 Communes of the Moselle department

Bibliography
 Dictionnaire hydrographique de la France, Antoine Louis Théodore Ravinet, 1824
 Notice de la Lorraine, Augustin Calmet, 1840
 Dictionnaire topographique du département de la Meurthe p 98, Henri Lepage, 1862
 Dictionnaire étymologique des noms de lieux en France, Albert Dauzat and Charles Rostaing, Larousse 1963
 Die Fränkischen und Alemannischen Siedlungen in Gallien, Adolf Schiber, 2011

References

External links

 L'Annuire service public: Lezey
 Annuaire-Mairie.fr: Lezey

Communes of Moselle (department)
Moselle communes articles needing translation from French Wikipedia